Claudia Cesarini (born 4 August 1986) is an Italian modern pentathlete.

Biography
At the 2012 Summer Olympics, she competed in the women's competition, finishing in 25th place. She also took part in the 2016 Summer Olympics in Rio de Janeiro finishing 23rd. She won two bronze medals in the team event at the Senior Europeans Championships in 2014 and 2015. At the 2016 World Cup #2 in Rio de Janeiro (Olympic Test Event for Rio 2016 Olympics) she won the gold medal in the individual competition. She has been the Italian National Champion in 2010, 2011 and 2013 in the individual competition.

References

External links 
 
 

Italian female modern pentathletes
1986 births
Living people
Olympic modern pentathletes of Italy
Modern pentathletes at the 2012 Summer Olympics
Modern pentathletes at the 2016 Summer Olympics
Sportspeople from Rome
Modern pentathletes of Fiamme Azzurre
21st-century Italian women